Trevor Kirk Wilson (born June 7, 1966) is an American former professional baseball pitcher who played in Major League Baseball (MLB) for the San Francisco Giants and Anaheim Angels, in all or parts of eight seasons between 1988 and 1998.

Career

Wilson graduated from Oregon City High School in Oregon City, Oregon. He enrolled at Oregon State University out of high school, but only attended for one term before deciding to turn professional, never playing baseball for the Beavers.

On June 7, 1992, Wilson struck out all three batters on nine total pitches in the ninth inning of a 5–2 win over the Houston Astros, becoming the 18th National League pitcher and the 27th pitcher in major-league history to throw an immaculate inning.

Since his retirement, Wilson has served as pitching coach for a number of minor league teams. His longest tenure to date was with the Salem-Keizer Volcanoes from 2000 to 2003. He currently is the pitching coach for the Arkansas Travelers in the Angels' organization.

References

External links

Pura Pelota (Venezuelan Winter League)

1966 births
Living people
American expatriate baseball players in Canada
Anaheim Angels players
Baseball coaches from California
Baseball coaches from Oregon
Baseball players from Torrance, California
Baseball players from Oregon
Clinton Giants players
Columbus Clippers players
Everett Giants players
Major League Baseball pitchers
Minor league baseball coaches
Oregon State University alumni 
Pastora de Occidente players
Sportspeople from Oregon City, Oregon
Phoenix Firebirds players
San Francisco Giants players
San Jose Giants players
Shreveport Captains players
Tigres de Aragua players
American expatriate baseball players in Venezuela
Vancouver Canadians players